Mihai Zafiu (born 9 June 1949) is a Romanian retired sprint canoer. He competed in the K-4 1000 m event at the 1972, 1976 and 1980 Olympics and won silver medals in 1972 and 1980, placing fourth in 1976. At the world championships he won six medals between 1970 and 1978, five of them in the K-1 4×500 m relay.

References

External links

1949 births
Canoeists at the 1972 Summer Olympics
Canoeists at the 1976 Summer Olympics
Canoeists at the 1980 Summer Olympics
Living people
Olympic canoeists of Romania
Olympic silver medalists for Romania
Romanian male canoeists
Olympic medalists in canoeing
ICF Canoe Sprint World Championships medalists in kayak
Sportspeople from Bucharest

Medalists at the 1980 Summer Olympics
Medalists at the 1972 Summer Olympics